Lipová-lázně (until 1960 Dolní Lipová) is a spa municipality and village in Jeseník District in the Olomouc Region of the Czech Republic. It has about 2,100 inhabitants.

Administrative parts
The village of Horní Lipová and the hamlet of Bobrovník are administrative parts of Lipová-lázně.

Geography
The northern part of the municipality lies in the Golden Mountains, the southern part lies in the Hrubý Jeseník mountains. The built-up area is situated in the valley of the Staříč stream.

History

The first written mention of Dolní Lipová under its Latin name Lynda is in a copy of a document, which describes the situation in 1290. At that time it became part of the newly formed Duchy of Nysa within fragmented Piast-ruled Poland. The next records are from the years 1372 and 1420. After that, the village was probably partially or completely abandoned and was not resettled until the mid-16th century.

The village was relatively unaffected by the Thirty Years' War, but several local women died during the infamous Northern Moravia witch trials between 1622 and 1684. The first written mention of Horní Lipová is from 1689.

In 1888, the railway was opened.

On 25 November 1931, an event known as the "Freiwaldau Strike" took place in Lipová-lázně. The local Communist party organised a hunger march of around 1,000 unemployed stoneworkers to Jeseník. The police chief at Vápenná instructed his men to prevent the demonstration from reaching the town. The police forced the marchers to take an alternative route through the forest. The police soon caught up with them at Lipová-lázně, and a clash ensued during which the marchers threw sticks, stones and other objects at the gendarmes. After two stones hit the commander of the unit on the forehead, the gendarmes started shooting at the crowd. As a result, eight people were killed and ten people were seriously injured and taken to the hospital. A memorial was erected in 1951 to commemorate this event.

From 1938 to 1945 it was a part of Reichsgau Sudetenland under Nazi Germany. During the World War II, the German occupiers operated the E797 forced labour subcamp of the Stalag VIII-B/344 prisoner-of-war camp in Lipová-lázně, and E333 and E380 subcamps in Horní Lipová.

Economy

The municipality is known for its spa, established in 1837 by Johann Schroth.

Notable people
Johann Schroth (1798–1856), Austrian naturopath; worked and died here

Twin towns – sister cities

Lipová-lázně is twinned with:
 Krapkowice, Poland

References

External links

Villages in Jeseník District
Spa towns in the Czech Republic
Czech Silesia